Derry Township is a township in Westmoreland County, Pennsylvania, United States. It surrounds the borough of Derry, which is a separate municipality. As of the 2020 census, the township population was 13,631.

It was named after the city of Derry by Scots-Irish settlers.

History
The first settlements in Derry township were created by soldiers from Forbes' army in 1762. After hearing of the land being settled by soldiers from Forbes' army, John Pomroy, a man of Scots-Irish descent, left his home in Cumberland valley and settled in Derry township, near present-day New Derry. Later, James Wilson came and settled near by and they helped one another build and farm. One winter, a few years after settling in Derry township, Pomroy and Wilson returned to their homes in the East. When they returned, each brought with him a wife. Pomroy married Isabel Barr. Later, her father and two of her brothers, along with William Guthrie and Richard Wallace and others migrated to Derry township.

To protect the citizens of Derry township from Indian attacks, Fort Barr and Fort Wallace were built in 1774. Other dangers that early settlers faced included bears, panthers, and foxes.

The Bear Cave is a natural maze of caverns. Some 8,500 feet of passages have been mapped and it has become a popular recreational site. After 1839, accounts of the Bear Cave began to appear in local newspapers.

Keystone State Park was established in 1945.

The Samuel Patterson House was added to the National Register of Historic Places in 1985.

Geography

The township contains the following communities: Andrico, Andrico No. 2, Atlantic, Bairdstown, Bradenville, Brenizer, Hillside, Loyalhanna, Cokeville Heights, Cooperstown, Kingston, Mannitto Haven, McChesneytown, Millwood, New Derry, Osburn, Pandora, Peanut, Seger, Snydertown, Superior, Torrance, and West Derry.

The villages of Livermore and Cokeville no longer exist, relocated as part of the Conemaugh Dam Flood Control project.

To the west lie Unity Township, Latrobe, and Salem Township and New Alexandria; to the north lie Loyalhanna Township, Conemaugh Township, Black Lick Township, Burrell Township and Blairsville; to the east,  Fairfield Township; and to the south, Ligonier Township.

Derry borough is entirely situated within Derry Township.

It is traversed by the William Penn Highway (US-22 / US-119 concurrency) across the northern half of the township.  US-30 runs along the southern border.

The Chestnut Ridge makes up the southeastern border that meets both Fairfield and Ligonier Townships

The Loyalhanna Creek makes up the southern and eastern borders with Unity Township, Latrobe and Salem Township

The Conemaugh River makes up the northern border with Burrel Township, Blairsville, Black Lick Township and Conemaugh Township

Government
The township is classed as a township of the second class of the Commonwealth of Pennsylvania. A three-person board of supervisors, elected for a six-year term, governs the township.

Public Services
Water is provided by a variety of sources depending on where one lives in the township including, the Municipal Authority
of the Borough of Derry, the Highridge Water Authority, the Latrobe Municipal Authority, or the Municipal Authority of Westmoreland County.  Likewise, sewage is also provided by a variety of sources depending on where one lives in the township including, the Municipal Authority of the Borough of Derry, the Derry Township Municipal Authority, the Latrobe Municipal Authority.  Fire protection services are provided by the Derry Township VFD Co.1 of Bradenville.

Demographics

As of the census of 2000, there were 14,726 people, 5,716 households, and 4,201 families residing in the township. The population density was 153.6 people per square mile (59.3/km2). There were 6,200 housing units at an average density of 64.7/sq mi (25.0/km2). The racial makeup of the township was 98.21% White, 1.18% African American, 0.14% Asian, 0.03% Native American, 0.01% Pacific Islander, 0.05% from other races, and 0.37% from two or more races. Hispanic or Latino of any race were 0.47% of the population.

There were 5,716 households, out of which 29.8% had children under the age of 18 living with them, 58.9% were married couples living together, 10.1% had a female householder with no husband present, and 26.5% were non-families. 23.2% of all households were made up of individuals, and 11.0% had someone living alone who was 65 years of age or older. The average household size was 2.48 and the average family size was 2.91.

In the township the population was spread out, with 22.2% under the age of 18, 6.7% from 18 to 24, 28.3% from 25 to 44, 26.0% from 45 to 64, and 16.7% who were 65 years of age or older. The median age was 41 years. For every 100 females, there were 97.9 males. For every 100 females age 18 and over, there were 94.8 males.

The median income for a household in the township was $34,208, and the median income for a family was $40,878. Males had a median income of $32,589 versus $22,147 for females. The per capita income for the township was $16,425. About 8.3% of families and 10.1% of the population were below the poverty line, including 14.5% of those under age 18 and 5.5% of those age 65 or over.

References

External links 

 Derry Township

Townships in Westmoreland County, Pennsylvania
Pittsburgh metropolitan area
Townships in Pennsylvania